Marengo is a genus of Asian jumping spiders that was first described by George and Elizabeth Peckham in 1892. The name is derived from Marengo, a village in Italy and the name of Napoleon's horse.

Species
, the World Spider Catalog recognizes the following species, found only in Asia:
Marengo batheryensis Sudhin, Nafin, Benjamin & Sudhikumar, 2019 – India
Marengo crassipes Peckham & Peckham, 1892 (type) – India, Sri Lanka
Marengo deelemanae Benjamin, 2004 – Thailand
Marengo inornata (Simon, 1900) – Sri Lanka
Marengo nitida Simon, 1900 – Sri Lanka
Marengo rattotensis Benjamin, 2006 – Sri Lanka
Marengo sachintendulkar Malamel, Prajapati, Sudhikumar & Sebastian, 2019 – India
Marengo striatipes Simon, 1900 – Sri Lanka
Marengo zebra Sudhin, Nafin, Benjamin & Sudhikumar, 2019 – India

References

External links
 Photograph of Marengo sp.

Salticidae genera
Salticidae
Spiders of Asia